Melfort was a federal electoral district in Saskatchewan, Canada, that was represented in the House of Commons of Canada from 1925 to 1953. It was created in 1924 from Prince Albert riding, and was abolished in 1952 when it was redistributed into Humboldt—Melfort, Mackenzie, Prince Albert, and Rosthern ridings.

Members of Parliament 

This riding elected the following Members of Parliament:

Malcolm McLean, Liberal (1925–1930)
Robert Weir, Conservative (1930–1935)
Malcolm McLean, Liberal (1935–1940)
Percy Ellis Wright, Co-operative Commonwealth Federation (1940–1953)

Election results

 
|Farmer
|DOYLE, Ferman E. ||align=right|1,435 

By-election: On Mr. Weir's acceptance of an office of emolument under the Crown, 8 August 1930

See also 

 List of Canadian federal electoral districts
 Past Canadian electoral districts

External links 
 

Former federal electoral districts of Saskatchewan